New Broughton Road Halt railway station was a station in New Broughton, Wrexham, Wales. The station was opened in May 1905 and closed on 1 March 1917.

References

Disused railway stations in Wrexham County Borough
Railway stations in Great Britain opened in 1905
Railway stations in Great Britain closed in 1917
Former Great Central Railway stations